John Anthony Carmine Michael "Jackie" Basehart (11 October 1951 – 16 May 2015) was an American actor.

Life and career
Born in Santa Monica, California, Basehart was the son of actor Richard Basehart and actress Valentina Cortese, who had met while making a film together.

For a few years, between the mid-1970s and the early 1980s, he was among the most requested young actors in Italian cinema, appearing in many films, although mainly in supporting roles. At that time he was hailed for "genius and recklessness" because of his excesses, which were extensively discussed by Italian gossip columns.

Last years and death
Struck by a supranuclear palsy, which progressively involved difficulty in swallowing, obesity, several hospitalizations and operations, and gradual paralysis, Basehart died at his home in Milan on 16 May 2015, at age 63, predeceasing his mother.

Partial filmography
   Sealed Orders - Voyage to the Bottom of the Sea (1967)
 La linea del fiume (1976) - Owen
 Mimì Bluette... fiore del mio giardino (1976) - David Ross
 The Black Corsair (1976) - Corsaro Rosso
 The Inglorious Bastards (1978) - Berle
 The Iron Hand of the Mafia (1980) - Tony
 Sesso e volentieri (1982) - The Prince
 Viuuulentemente mia (1982) - Frank Lovejoy 
 Odd Squad (1983) - Pvt. Kirk Jones
 Mai con le donne (1985)
 Festival (1996)
 The Return of Sandokan (1996) - Sir Burton
 Tea with Mussolini (1999) - Count Bernardini (final film role)

References

External links
 

1951 births
2015 deaths
American male film actors
Italian male film actors
American emigrants to Italy
20th-century American male actors
21st-century American male actors
20th-century Italian male actors
21st-century Italian male actors
Neurological disease deaths in Lombardy
Deaths from progressive supranuclear palsy